The Ice hockey championship of the lands of the Bohemian Crown was the national ice hockey championship in the lands of the Bohemian Crown from 1909-1912.

Champions
1909 SK Slavia Prague
1911 SK Slavia Prague
1912 SK Slavia Prague

References

Defunct ice hockey leagues in Europe
Ice hockey leagues in the Czech Republic
Sport in the Kingdom of Bohemia